The 1972–73 Minnesota North Stars season was the North Stars' sixth season.

Coached by Jack Gordon, the team compiled a record of 37–30–11 for 85 points, to finish the regular season 3rd in the West Division. In the playoffs they lost the quarter-finals 4–2 to the Philadelphia Flyers.

Offseason

Regular season

Final standings

Schedule and results

Playoffs

Player statistics

Awards and records

Transactions

Draft picks
Minnesota's draft picks at the 1972 NHL Amateur Draft held at the Queen Elizabeth Hotel in Montreal, Quebec.

Farm teams

See also
1972–73 NHL season

References

External links

Minnesota
Minnesota
Minnesota North Stars seasons
Minnesota North Stars
Minnesota North Stars